The 1912–13 season saw Rochdale compete in The F.A. Cup for the 5th time and reached the first round proper. The also competed in the Central League and finished 7th.

Statistics

|}

Competitions

Central League

F.A. Cup

Lancashire Senior Cup

Manchester Senior Cup

Friendlies

References

Rochdale A.F.C. seasons
Rochdale